These are the results for the boys' 10 metre air rifle event at the 2018 Summer Youth Olympics.

Results

Qualification

Final

External links

Qualification results
Final results

Shooting at the 2018 Summer Youth Olympics